WHC may refer to:

 Walthamstow Central station, London, by National Rail station code
 Woking Hockey Club
 Women's Health Co-Op
 Women's Hospital Corps
 World Heavyweight Championship
 UNESCO World Heritage Committee
 World Hindi Conference
 World Hockey Championship
 World Humanist Congress
 Wrestling Hardcore Corporation 
 Western Harbour Crossing, a transport tunnel in Hong Kong
 Web Hosting Canada